Vizefeldwebel Alfons Nagler, also Alfons Nagler, (born 4 August 1893, date of death unknown) was a World War I flying ace credited with ten aerial victories.

Early life

Alfons Nagler was born on 4 August 1893 in Ertingen, Kingdom of Württemberg, the German Empire. As part of his education, he trained as a mechanic. As a mechanic, he enlisted in the Imperial German Air Service as a reservist on 4 October 1913.

World War I service
Nagler was in the reserves when World War I began. He served as a mechanic in FA 4 until 6 May 1915, when he reported for pilot training. Upon graduation, he was stationed with FA(A) 220 on the Russian Front on 8 October. He served with this unit until 27 September 1917. He then served with the fighter unit attached to FA(A) 220 until 10 December. Then he was transferred to Jasta Over-Ost. From there, he was forwarded on 26 March 1918 to Jagdstaffel 74. When Jasta Over-Ost became Jagdstaffel 81, Nagler rejoined them. Between 27 May and 5 October 1918, he ran up a score of nine Spads and a Breguet XIV shot down. By the time the war ended, he had earned not only the Iron Cross, but two Austro-Hungarian medals and one from Baden.

Sources of information

References
Above the Lines: The Aces and Fighter Units of the German Air Service, Naval Air Service and Flanders Marine Corps 1914 - 1918 Norman L. R. Franks, et al. Grub Street, 1993. , .

1893 births
Year of death missing
German World War I flying aces
Military personnel from Baden-Württemberg
People from Biberach (district)
Recipients of the Iron Cross (1914), 1st class
Luftstreitkräfte personnel